Van is a masculine given name and nickname, sometimes a short form of Evan, Ivan, Vance, or the feminine Vanessa. It may refer to:

People

Given name
Van Alexander (1915–2015), American bandleader, arranger and composer
Van T. Barfoot (1919–2012), American Army officer, Medal of Honor recipient
Van D. Bell (1918–2009), American Marine officer, recipient of two Navy Crosses
Van Green (born 1951), American football player
Van Johnson (1916–2008), American actor
Van Johnson (racing driver) (1927–1959), American racing driver
Van Miller (1927–2015), American sports announcer
Van Nelson (born 1945), American long-distance runner
Van Patrick (1916–1974), American sportscaster 
Van Snider (born 1963), American baseball player
Van Tiffin (born 1965), American football placekicker
Van Van Wey (1924–1991), former NASCAR driver
Van Winitsky (born 1959), American tennis player

Nickname
Van Braxton, 21st century American politician
Van Cliburn (1934–2013), American pianist
Ivan R. Gates (1890–1932), American aviator and entrepreneur, founder of the barnstorming Gates Flying Circus
Van Hansis (born 1981), American actor
Van Heflin (1908–1971), American actor
Van Jefferson (born 1996), American football player
Van Jones (born 1968), American news commentator and activist
Van Morrison (born 1945), Northern Irish singer, songwriter, musician and producer
Willard Van Orman Quine (1908–2000), American philosopher and logician

Fictional characters
 Van, from the Pixar film Cars; see List of Cars characters
 Van, from the PlayStation game Chrono Cross; see Characters of Chrono Cross
 Van, from the anime Gun X Sword; see List of Gun Sword characters
 Van Arkride, from the game The Legend of Heroes: Kuro no Kiseki
 Van Fanel, from the anime The Vision of Escaflowne; see List of The Vision of Escaflowne characters
 Van Flyheight, from the anime Zoids: Chaotic Century
 Van Hohenheim, from the Fullmetal Alchemist franchise; see List of Fullmetal Alchemist characters
 Van Montgomery, from the TV series Reba; see List of Reba characters
 Van Veen, main character of Vladimir Nabokov's Ada or Ardor: A Family Chronicle
 Van Wilder, protagonist of the film National Lampoon's Van Wilder

English-language masculine given names
Lists of people by nickname
Hypocorisms